Stephanie Valin (born July 6, 1987) is a water polo player from Canada. She was born in Montreal, Quebec.

She was a member of the Canada women's national water polo team at the 2011 World Aquatics Championships, 2013 World Aquatics Championships, and at the 2015 Pan American Games.

References

External links
 Stephanie Valin
  Stephanie Valin Pictures, Photos & Images - Zimbio
 MARKHAM, ON- JANUARY 26 - Stephanie Valin takes a break as the...
 MARKHAM, ON- JANUARY 26 - Stephanie Valin listens to coaches...

1987 births
Living people
Canadian female water polo players
Medalists at the 2015 Pan American Games
Pan American Games medalists in water polo
Pan American Games silver medalists for Canada
Water polo players from Montreal
Water polo players at the 2015 Pan American Games